Oracle Academy (OA) is Oracle’s philanthropic educational program available in more than 120 countries. Oracle Academy offers a variety of computer science education resources to secondary schools, vocational colleges and universities. In addition, OA also offers training courses to students and faculty of member institutions. All institution members are granted the right to use Oracle’s software in classrooms for teaching, academic and research.

See also
 Oracle Certification Program
 Google University

References

External links

Oracle Corporation
Sun Microsystems
Information technology organizations
Computer science education